Alexander Donald McLeod (13 July 1872 – 20 October 1938) was a Reform Party Member of Parliament in the Wairarapa region of New Zealand. He was Minister of Lands (1924–1928) and Industries and Commerce (1926–1928) in the Reform Government.

Early life
McLeod was born in the Wairarapa in 1872. He was the third son of William McLeod, one of the pioneers of the district. He became an apprentice on his father's farm and afterwards ran his own sheep farm. He was elected onto the Featherston Road Board and, when it was formed in 1902, the Featherston County Council. He remained on the county council until 1919.

Member of Parliament

McLeod won the Wairarapa electorate in the 1919 general election in a triangular contest, defeating the incumbent, J. T. Marryat Hornsby. He held the electorate until 1928, when he was defeated by Thomas William McDonald of the United Party. McLeod won the seat back in 1931, and retired in 1935. He was Minister of Lands (1924–1928) and Minister of Industries and Commerce (1926–1928). McLeod was the New Zealand government representative to Australia in May 1927 at the inauguration of the new Parliament House when the federal capital moved to Canberra.

Part of the agreement was that all sitting members who support the coalition would in turn receive the official endorsement as coalition candidate. This pragmatic decision caused trouble in those electorates where the voters were not satisfied with the incumbent's performance, for example in the Wairarapa and  electorates. Local electorate committees were not supportive of McDonald and supported McLeod instead. Consequently, McLeod stood as a Coalition Independent or Independent Reform candidate in 1931 and won the election with a 7% margin of the votes. McLeod was a supporter of the coalition in the house.

McLeod was a close associate of Gordon Coates.

In 1935, McLeod was awarded the King George V Silver Jubilee Medal.

Later life
McLeod was a member of the Wellington Harbour Board (April 1919 – April 1921) and the Wairarapa member of the Wellington Hospital Board. He was a steward of the Wairarapa Racing Club.

McLeod died at his home at Martinborough on 20 October 1938, and was buried at Martinborough Cemetery. He was survived by his wife and children, his son Norman Murdoch McLeod having drowned while duck-shooting at Kahutara in 1936.

Notes

References

Reform Party (New Zealand) MPs
Independent MPs of New Zealand
Members of the Cabinet of New Zealand
1872 births
1938 deaths
Members of the New Zealand House of Representatives
New Zealand MPs for North Island electorates
People from Martinborough
Unsuccessful candidates in the 1928 New Zealand general election
Wellington Harbour Board members
Wellington Hospital Board members